Prettyblack is the second solo studio album by Prince Po, one half of American hip hop duo Organized Konfusion. It was released on Nasty Habits Entertainment and Traffic Entertainment Group in 2006.

Critical reception

Lyndon of Cyclic Defrost gave the album a mixed review, stating that "[Prince Po's] gruff voice is immediately arresting on [the album's] opening tunes, but further on, the vocal stylings seem to meander into uninspiring territory, not taking the listener to anywhere new or dynamic."

Track listing

Personnel
Credits adapted from the CD edition's liner notes.

 Prince Po – vocals, production (2, 6, 9, 13)
 Finale – production (1)
 Madlib – production (3)
 2Mex – vocals (4)
 C.J. – production (4, 11), vocals (6)
 Chas West – vocals (5)
 DJ Rhettmatic – turntables (5)
 Large Professor – production (5)
 Presto – vocals (6)
 Soulsearchin – production (7)
 Touchem Black – additional vocals (8)
 Rockwilder – production (8)
 China Black – vocals (10)
 Ammoncontact – production (10)
 Concise Kilgore – vocals (13)
 Brisk – production (14)

References

External links
 

2006 albums
Prince Po albums
Albums produced by Madlib
Albums produced by Large Professor
Albums produced by Rockwilder